Alco typically refers to the American Locomotive Company, a defunct locomotive manufacturer.

Alco may also refer to:

Companies
ALCO Stores, a defunct American discount store
Alco Hydro-Aeroplane Company, the original name of the company that became Lockheed Corporation
 ALCO was a trade name of the British company Arthur Lyon & Co of London

Places
Alco, Arkansas, an unincorporated community in Stone County
Alco, Louisiana, an unincorporated community in Vernon Parish

Other uses
Alcon (classical history), an Ancient Greek name whose Latin form Alco is also used in English
Acción Cultural Loyola (ACLO), a Bolivian radio network
ALCO, the Asset and liability management committee

See also
Alko, the national alcoholic beverage retailing monopoly in Finland